Newfoundland and Labrador provincial electoral districts are currently single member ridings that each elect one member to the Newfoundland and Labrador House of Assembly.

List of current districts 

 Baie Verte-Green Bay
 Bonavista (electoral district)
 Burgeo-La Poile
 Burin-Grand Bank
 Cape St. Francis (electoral district)
 Carbonear-Trinity-Bay de Verde
 Cartwright-L'Anse au Clair
 Conception Bay East-Bell Island
 Conception Bay South (electoral district)
 Corner Brook (electoral district)
 Exploits (electoral district)
 Ferryland (electoral district)
 Fogo Island-Cape Freels
 Fortune Bay-Cape La Hune
 Gander (electoral district)
 Grand Falls-Windsor-Buchans
 Harbour Grace-Port de Grave
 Harbour Main
 Humber-Bay of Islands
 Humber-Gros Morne
 Labrador West (electoral district)
 Lake Melville (electoral district)
 Lewisporte-Twillingate
 Mount Pearl-Southlands
 Mount Pearl North
 Mount Scio
 Placentia-St. Mary's
 Placentia West-Bellevue
 St. Barbe-L'Anse aux Meadows
 St. George's-Humber
 St. John's Centre
 St. John's East-Quidi Vidi
 St. John's West
 Stephenville-Port au Port
 Terra Nova (electoral district)
 Topsail-Paradise
 Torngat Mountains (electoral district)
 Virginia Waters-Pleasantville
 Waterford Valley
 Windsor Lake

Former or defunct districts 
 Bellevue (electoral district)
 Bonavista North
 Bonavista South
 Burin-Placentia West
 Carbonear-Harbour Grace
 Grand Bank (electoral district)
 Grand Falls-Windsor-Green Bay South
 Humber East
 Humber Valley (electoral district)
 Humber West
 Lewisporte (electoral district)
 The Isles of Notre Dame
 Kilbride (electoral district)
 Mount Pearl South
 Pleasantville (electoral district)
 Port au Port (electoral district)
 Port de Grave (electoral district)
 Signal Hill-Quidi Vidi
 St. Barbe (electoral district)
 St. George's-Stephenville East
 St. John's East (provincial electoral district)
 St. John's North (provincial electoral district)
 St. John's South (provincial electoral district)
 The Straits – White Bay North
 Topsail (electoral district)
 Trinity North
 Virginia Waters

See also 
 Canadian provincial electoral districts
 50th General Assembly of Newfoundland and Labrador

References

Newfoundland and Labrador provincial electoral districts
Newfoundland
Electoral districts